Women's Auxiliary Service may refer to:
Women's Auxiliary Service (Burma), a group of British and Australian women who manned Mobile Canteens for the troops of Burma Command in World War II
Women's Auxiliary Service (Poland), a unit of the Polish Armed Forces during World War II
Women's Auxiliary Service (United Kingdom), a national voluntary organisation in the United Kingdom